Melissa Suzanne Cline is an American biologist. She is an Associate Research Scientist at the UC Santa Cruz Genomics Institute
Between June 2001 and December 2004 she was a staff scientist at Affymetrix, Inc. in Emeryville, California where she was involved in developing ANOSVA, a "statistical method to identify alternative spicing from expression data," during which she "analyzed the effects of alternative splicing on protein transmembrane and signal peptide regions".  Subsequently, she moved to UC Santa Cruz, where she wrote on genome browsing. According to the Thomson Reuters report, she was one of the most highly cited scientists in the world in 2012/13. 

Cline is currently the program manager for the BRCA Exchange, a platform that pools data on the tens of thousands of BRCA 1 and BRCA 2 genetic variants that could influence a person's susceptibility to breast cancer, as well as corresponding clinical data about those variants, and is working with the patient advocacy nonprofit No Stomach For Cancer to release a similar web portal designed to help researchers identify individuals at risk of heritable stomach cancers.

References

External links
Profile at the University of California, Santa Cruz

American women scientists
21st-century American biologists
Living people
Year of birth missing (living people)
University of California, Santa Cruz faculty
21st-century American women scientists